is a Japanese actress from Seya-ku, Yokohama, Kanagawa Prefecture. She made her acting debut in 1978 as a Horipro talent and has also voiced Shura in the anime Rurouni Kenshin. She also performs as a singer, including the opening and ending theme songs for the tokusatsu series Morimori Bokkun. She also portrayed Mako Shiraishi's mother in Samurai Sentai Shinkenger.

Filmography

Television
Ponytail wa Furimukanai (1985)
Juken Sentai Gekiranger as Miki (2007)
Samurai Sentai Shinkenger as former Shinkenpink/mother of Mako Shiraishi (2009, guest)
The Emperor's Cook as Takigawa (Lady-in-waiting of Empress Teimei) (2015) 
Mashin Sentai Kiramager as Miki (2020)

Film
Juken Sentai Gekiranger: Nei-Nei! Hou-Hou! Hong Kong Decisive Battle as Miki (2007)
Juken Sentai Gekiranger vs Boukenger as Miki (2007)
Engine Sentai Go-onger vs. Gekiranger as Miki (2008)
Perfect World (2018)
 Tyida (2022)

Animation
Rurouni Kenshin (xxxx) as Shura

References

External links
Kazue Itoh at Horipro

1966 births
Living people
Voice actresses from Yokohama
Japanese voice actresses
Japanese television actresses